Janez Pintar (11 March 1931 – 22 April 2006) was a Slovenian rower who represented Yugoslavia. He competed in the men's coxed four event at the 1960 Summer Olympics.

References

1931 births
2006 deaths
Slovenian male rowers
Olympic rowers of Yugoslavia
Rowers at the 1960 Summer Olympics
Sportspeople from Ljubljana